FC Shinnik Yaroslavl is a Russian football club, based in Yaroslavl.

From 1957 to 1960 the team was called Khimik ( - "the chemist").

In the USSR championships the team held 1346 matches (523 wins, 376 draws, 447 defeats), with the goal difference 1652:1499 (+153).

League history 

{| class="wikitable mw-collapsible mw-collapsed" align=center cellspacing="0" cellpadding="3" style="border:1px solid #AAAAAA;font-size:90%"
|- style="background:#efefef;"
! Season
! Div.
! Pos.
! Pl.
! W
! D
! L
! GS
! GA
! P
!Cup
!colspan=2|Europe
!Top scorer (league)
|-
||1992   ||RFPL|| style="background:pink;"|19||30||4||6||20||23||48||14||1/64||colspan="2"|–||align="left"| Pomazov,  Moiseev – 6
|-
||1993||2nd, "Center"||6||38||17||2||9||78||47||46||1/8||colspan="2"|–||align="left"| Smirnov – 25
|-
||1994||rowspan="3"|2nd||5||42||21||8||13||69||44||50||1/128||colspan="2"|–||align="left"| Yablochkin – 21
|-
||1995||5||42||21||9||12||56||39||72||1/16||colspan="2"|–||align="left"| Ilyaskin – 12
|-
||1996|| style="background:lightgreen;"|2||42||24||11||7||66||32||83||1/64||colspan="2"|–||align="left"| Yablochkin – 15
|-
||1997||rowspan="3"|RFPL||4||34||15||10||9||38||35||55||1/16||colspan="2"|–||align="left"| Gerasimov – 9
|-
||1998||14||30||9||8||13||30||40||35||1/16||UIC||R3||align="left"| Leonchenko,  Serebrennikov – 6
|-
||1999|| style="background:pink;"|16||30||5||9||16||21||45||24||1/4||colspan="2"|–||align="left"| Bychkov – 7
|-
||2000||rowspan="2"|2nd||4||38||20||11||7||58||33||71||1/16||colspan="2"|–||align="left"| Bakalets,  Gavrilin – 8
|-
||2001|| style="background:lightgreen;"|1||34||21||6||7||58||21||69||1/16||colspan="2"|–||align="left"| Shkapenko,  Bychkov,  Gavrilin – 8
|-
||2002||rowspan="5"|RFPL||7||30||13||8||9||42||37||47||1/8||colspan="2"|–||align="left"| Khomukha – 5
|-
||2003||5||30||12||11||7||43||34||47||1/16||colspan="2"|–||align="left"| Kushev – 9
|-
||2004||6||30||12||8||10||29||29||44||1/2||UIC||R3||align="left"| Shirko – 7
|-
||2005||9||30||9||11||10||26||31||38||1/4||colspan="2"|–||align="left"| Khazov – 5
|-
||2006|| style="background:pink;"|16||30||1||8||21||17||56||11||1/8||colspan="2"|–||align="left"| Khazov – 4
|-
||2007||2nd|| style="background:lightgreen;"|1||42||28||8||6||68||30||92||1/16||colspan="2"|–||align="left"| Monaryov – 20
|-
||2008||RFPL|| style="background:pink;"|15||30||5||7||18||25||48||22||1/16||colspan="2"|–||align="left"| Boyarintsev – 7
|-
||2009||rowspan="2"|2nd||6||38||18||7||13||46||35||61||1/8||colspan="2"|–||align="left"| Burmistrov – 12
|-
||2010||10||38||14||13||11||43||31||55||1/8||colspan="2"|–||align="left"| Vještica,  Arkhipov – 8
|-
||2011–12||rowspan="10"|FNL||4||52||25||10||17||70||56||85||1/16||colspan="2"|–||align="left"| Nizamutdinov – 14
|-
||2012–13||11||32||9||12||11||28||33||39||1/32||colspan="2"|–||align="left"| Korytko – 7
|-
||2013–14||6||36||17||6||13||47||37||57||1/32||colspan="2"|–||align="left"| Korytko – 8
|-
||2014–15||6||34||12||17||5||44||33||53||1/16||colspan="2"|–||align="left"| Nizamutdinov,  Samodin – 11
|-
||2015–16||12||38||13||11||14||50||49||50||1/32||colspan="2"|–||align="left"| Malyarov – 7
|-
||2016–17||8||38||15||9||14||41||39||54||1/32||colspan="2"|–||align="left"| Zemskov – 7
|-
||2017–18||8||38||14||11||13||45||45||53||SF||colspan="2"|–||align="left"| Nizamutdinov – 8
|-
||2018–19||6||38||16||12||10||42||31||60||1/64||colspan="2"|–||align="left"| Kamilov,  Geloyan,  Samodin – 7
|-
||2019–20||8||27||12||7||8||43||35||43||QF||colspan="2"|–||align="left"| Samodin – 10
|-
||2020–21|| 22|| 42|| 5|| 10|| 27|| 39|| 90|| 25||1/32||colspan="2"|–||Nizamutdinov — 9
|-
|2021—22
|FNL-2
|1
|32
|25
|5
|2
|38
|8
|55
|1/128
|
|
| Nizamutdinov,  Azyavin — 9
|}

European

Current squad 
, according to the official First League site.

Out on loan

Notable players 
Had international caps for their respective countries. Players whose name is listed in bold represented their countries while playing for Shinnik.

USSR/Russia
 Anatoli Isayev
 Anatoli Maslyonkin
 Nikolai Parshin
 Valeri Kleimyonov
 Maksim Belyayev
 Denis Boyarintsev
 Yevgeni Bushmanov
 Vladimir But
 Maksim Buznikin
 Dmitri Chistyakov
 Vyacheslav Dayev
 Aleksei Gerasimenko
 Sergey Grishin
 Valery Kechinov
 Zaur Khapov
 Oleg Kornaukhov
 Ilya Maksimov
 Mukhsin Mukhamadiev
 Gennadiy Nizhegorodov
 Sergei Pesyakov
 Pavel Pogrebnyak
 Dmitri Popov
 Artyom Rebrov
 Dmitri Sennikov
 Roman Sharonov
 Aleksandr Shirko
 Vladislav Ternavski
 Dmitri Vasilyev
 Artyom Yenin

Former USSR countries
 Garnik Avalyan
 Artur Sarkisov
 Uladzimir Karytska
 Aliaksandr Kulchiy
 Sergei Omelyanchuk
 Sergei Shtanyuk
 Alyaksey Suchkow
 Aleksandr Amisulashvili
 Zurab Menteshashvili
 Ruslan Baltiev
 Renat Dubinskiy
 Andrey Shkurin
 Valeriy Yablochkin
 Victor Berco
 Valeriu Catinsus
 Vladimir Cosse
 Ghenadie Olexici
 Arsen Avakov
 Rahmatullo Fuzailov
 Farkhod Vasiev
  Dmitri Khomukha
 Ilya Blyzniuk
 Yevhen Drahunov
 Yuriy Dmitrulin
 Yevhen Lutsenko
 Serhiy Serebrennikov
 Vyacheslav Shevchuk
 Pavlo Shkapenko
 Serhiy Snytko
 Mykhailo Starostyak

 Artem Yashkin
 Victor Karpenko
 Leonid Koshelev
 Sergei Lebedev
 Aleksey Nikolaev
 Andrei Rezantsev
 Yevgeni Safonov
 Nikolai Sergiyenko
 Vladimir Shishelov

Europe
 Darko Maletić
 Emir Spahić
 Martin Kushev
 Zdravko Lazarov
 Sergei Terehhov
 Konstantīns Igošins
 Valērijs Ivanovs
 Ģirts Karlsons
 Juris Laizāns
 Valentīns Lobaņovs
 Andrejs Rubins
 Igors Stepanovs
 Armands Zeiberliņš
 Damian Gorawski
 Goran Trobok
 Darijan Matič
 Aleksandar Radosavljević

Africa
 André Bikey
 Serge Branco

See also
 Aleksei Kazalov, assistant manager of the club

References 

 
Association football clubs established in 1957
Shinnik Yaroslavl
Shinnik Yaroslavl
1957 establishments in Russia
Soviet Top League clubs